Rocafort is a town near Valencia, Spain.

"Rocafort" may also refer to:

Places
 Rocafort (Barcelona Metro), railway station
 Rocafort de Queralt, village in Conca de Barberà, Catalonia
 Rocafort de Vallbona, village in Sant Martí de Riucorb municipality, Catalonia
 Rocafort, village in El Pont de Vilomara i Rocafort municipality, Catalonia

People
 Kenneth Rocafort, Puerto Rican illustrator